In the Book of Mormon, Sam was the third son of Lehi, and elder brother to the prophet Nephi.  Early in the Book of Mormon, Nephi confided in Sam.  Lehi saw Sam in his vision of the tree of life, noting that he ate the precious fruit, symbolizing the righteousness of Sam, and that he would be saved.  Upon the death of Lehi, Sam followed his brother Nephi in the establishment of the Nephites.

Among LDS linguists, the leading theory of the origin of the name "Sam" is that it is most likely a Hebrew dialectal form of "Shem".

Family

References

Further reading
 Ken Haubrock,  “Sam: A Just and Holy Man,”. Journal of Book of Mormon Studies 5/2 (1996): 164–68.

Book of Mormon people